LittleBigPlanet is a puzzle platform video game (with user-generated content) for the PlayStation 3. It is developed by Media Molecule, a British company founded in part by Rag Doll Kung Fu creator Mark Healey, and published by Sony Computer Entertainment Europe (SCE).
The game received an overwhelmingly positive reaction from critics and has been praised for its presentation, including its graphics, physics and audio, along with its gameplay and large array of customisable and online features.

For the game, Media Molecule has released numerous downloadable content (DLC) packs on the PlayStation Store. All DLC packs released for LittleBigPlanet are also compatible with LittleBigPlanet 2 but those designed for the sequel are not available in the first game. Costumes from both LittleBigPlanet and LittleBigPlanet 2 are compatible with the PlayStation Vita version of the game, as well as LittleBigPlanet Karting for the PS3. The content of the game's DLC packs vary but include costumes, stickers, decorations, objects, music, creation tools and new levels. Some of these packs are available free of charge while others are available to purchase.  Much of the development of LittleBigPlanets DLC is outsourced by Media Molecule to their development partners, Tarsier Studios, Fireproof Games and Supermassive Games. The packs announced to date are listed below.

The Incredibles Costumes and Level Kit are to be removed from sale in the first week of June 2012 (Later returned in September 2014) It is the first time that non-free content has been removed from sale. No explanation of the reason why has been given.

As of 31 December 2015 all Marvel DLC packs have been removed from the PlayStation Store due to licensing expiration. Customers who have previously purchased this content will find they are temporarily unable to download these packs after this date. The Marvel DLC will once again become available for download for those who have previously purchased it at an, as of yet, undetermined date (never).

Downloadable packs and their contents

References

External links
 Official LittleBigPlanet Downloadable Content Catalogue

Lists of video game downloadable content
Lists of video games by franchise
D